D.V. Guruprasad, born in Bangalore in 1951 took his Bachelor of Science Degree from National College, Bangalore and later did his Masters in English Literature from Karnatak University, Dharwad. He joined the Indian Police Service (IPS) in 1976 and was allotted Karnataka cadre. He served as Superintendent of Police of Bidar, Gulbarga and Kodagu districts, DIG of Gulbarga Range, and  Commissioner of Police, Hubli-Dharwad. He headed the State Intelligence Department and the State Information Department. He headed the recruitment wing in the State Police and was responsible for initiating a very transparent recruitment process which brought him much laurels. He also had his stint in CISF, New Delhi. He served for five years in the Karnataka Road Transport Corporation and was instrumental in dividing the huge entity into four independent entities. He has had a small stint of police training in the U.K. He worked  as Director General of  Karnataka Criminal Investigation Department and retired as DGP Home Guards, Fire Force and Civil Defence in 2011.  He has written many books on Indian police system and related topics,travelogues in English and Kannada languages. He is also columnist of Deccan Herald, English  daily newspaper. 

He is an author of several books, both in English and Kannada

Books written
Common Man's Guide to Police & Criminal Laws, 
Corridors of Intelligence: Revealing Politics,  
CASE STUDIES FOR INDIAN POLICE: True situations handled by Indian Police and lessons learnt 
Police: What You Don't Know, 
Goodhacharyeya Aa Dinagalu (Kannada) 
Dantakatheyada Dantachora : Operation Veerappan Prathykashadarshigalu Kandanthe (Kannada)
Police Encounter(Kannada)
Kaige Banda Tuttu-Autobiography (Kannada) 
IGP Sahebra Senior P.A. (Kannada)

References

Indian Police Service officers
Karnataka Police
English-language writers from India
Kannada-language writers
1951 births
Living people
Karnatak University alumni